Valentine Rickard O'Connor (1878 – 23 June 1956) was an Irish cricketer.  O'Connor was a right-handed batsman who bowled right-arm slow.  He was born Ireland, but where exactly and on what exact date is unknown.

O'Connor, who played as an amateur, made his first-class debut for Middlesex in 1908 against Somerset at the County Ground, Taunton.  The following season he played 2 further first-class matches, both against Sussex.

In his 3 first-class matches, O'Connor scored 40 runs at a batting average of 10.00, with a high score of 30.  With the ball he took a single wicket in his only bowling innings, taking figures of 1/62.

He died in Paddington, London on 23 June 1956.

References

External links
Valentine O'Connor at Cricinfo
Valentine O'Connor at CricketArchive

1878 births
1956 deaths
Irish cricketers
Middlesex cricketers